Palme is a Swedish documentary film from 2012 directed, and written by Maud Nycander and Kristina Lindström. The film is a biographical portrait of the former Prime Minister Olof Palme, and covers his life from childhood to the role as a leading figure of Swedish politics.

It has been shown as a 103 minutes long feature film in the cinemas, and as a 175 minutes long TV-movie in three parts on SVT at Christmas and New Year the same year. At the 48th Guldbagge Awards, the film was nominated in three categories: Best Documentary Feature (Maud Nycander and Kristina Lindström), Best Editing (Andreas Jonsson, Hanna Lejonqvist and Niels Pagh Andersen) and Best Original Score (Benny Andersson). It won in the latter two categories.

Synopsis 
On Friday evening, February 28, 1986 Olof Palme was shot dead in the street. The day after, the news reached out to the people that the country's prime minister was dead, and the whole country found itself suddenly shocked.

In the film one can follow Palme's life from youth until he is murdered. His long career in the Swedish Social Democratic Party is also shown. Other subjects that the film also treats are more controversial topics, for example the situation with the IB affair. The film focuses on the person Olof Palme, as in almost 26 years has been overshadowed by his sudden death. It contains material from the Palmes family that has never been shown in public, private snapshots and family movies.

Cast (in selection) 

Olof Palme
Tage Erlander
Lisbeth Palme
Fidel Castro
Thorbjörn Fälldin
Ulf Adelsohn
Gösta Bohman
Ingvar Carlsson
Kjell-Olof Feldt
Anders Ferm
Lennart Geijer
Mona Sahlin
Carl Bildt
Harry Schein
Ingmar Bergman 
Roy Andersson
Desmond Tutu
Anna Lindh
Henry Kissinger
Astrid Lindgren
Tage Danielsson
Mattias Palme
Mårten Palme
Joakim Palme
Vilgot Sjöman
Kristina Lindström - Narrator

References

External links 

2012 films
Swedish documentary films
Documentary films about politicians
Olof Palme
Swedish biographical films
Films scored by Benny Andersson
2010s Swedish-language films
2010s Swedish films